Bonneville Speedway (also known as the Bonneville Salt Flats Race Track) is an area of the Bonneville Salt Flats northeast of Wendover, Utah, that is marked out for motor sports. It is particularly noted as the venue for numerous land speed records. The Bonneville Salt Flats Race Track is listed on the National Register of Historic Places.

The salt flats were first used for motor sports in 1912, but did not become truly popular until the 1930s when Ab Jenkins and Sir Malcolm Campbell competed to set land speed records.

A reduction of available racing surface and salt thickness has led to the cancellation of events at Bonneville, such as Speed Week in 2014 and 2015.
Available racing surface is much reduced with just  available instead of the  courses traditionally used for Speed Week.

Track layouts

Historically, the speedway was marked out by the Utah Department of Transportation at the start of each summer.

Since at least the 1990s, track preparations have been the responsibility of the event organizers. Days or weeks in advance, the track preparers identify an area best suited for their track layouts and begin grading the tracks. Surveyors are brought in to survey the timing trap distances. A day before racing begins, the track markers are added.

Originally, the straightaway was marked with a broad black line down its center. This was eventually changed to lines down either side, as the center line wore out too quickly. As the costs for painting the lines has gone up, organizations have switched to flags and cones as track markers. The last event to use black lines was Speed Week, August 2009.

The number of tracks and the timed sections for each track are set according to what is most beneficial for each event. Large public meets such as Speed Week run as many as four tracks with several timed miles, usually starting with the second mile and running to the fifth mile. Smaller meets that typically only run world record attempts will utilize a single track, with one timed mile and one timed kilometer in the middle of the track. Additional marks and cones indicate the end of the track and the position of timing equipment.

Deteriorating track conditions

The annual Speed Week was cancelled in both 2014 and 2015, as were many land-speed racing events, due to deteriorating track conditions. Although another section of the flats would normally be used, nearby salt mining operations had reduced the size of the alternative track.

The depth of the salt crust at Bonneville has also been decreasing, possibly leaching into a saltwater aquifer.

Though recent studies have been made (since 1960), the causes of this deterioration are not clear, although the evidence points toward both local climatic changes and salt mining. Some strategies were devised to revert the decreasing salt surface, such as pumping back salt, though this had no effect.

Events and meetings
In August, the Southern California Timing Association and Bonneville Nationals Inc. organize Speed Week, the largest meet of the year, which attracts several hundred drivers who compete to set highest speed in a range of categories. Bonneville Speed Week has been taking place since 1949.

In late August, the Bonneville Motorcycle Speed Trials are held.

In September each year is the World of Speed, (similar to Speed Week) organized by the Utah Salt Flats Racing Association. The USFRA also meet on the first Wednesday of each month throughout the summer.

In October, the Southern California Timing Association puts on World Finals, a scaled-down version of Speed Week. This event tends to have cooler weather and often drier salt that Speed Week the prior month. There are less spectators and it tends to draw serious racers, as this event is the last chance to break a land speed record and be in the SCTA record book for that year.

Each year, there are usually a few private meets that are not publicized scattered among the larger public meets.

Land speed records
Numerous land speed records in various vehicle categories and classes have been set on the Bonneville speed way. Other notable examples of Bonneville speed records include:

Cycling records

Several motor-paced racing speed records have been attempted at Bonneville.

On 15 October 1995, Dutch cyclist Fred Rompelberg achieved , using a special bicycle behind a dragster with a large shield.

She was coached by Howard. It is not clear which authority was supervising the record attempt.

In popular culture
In the series finale episode of Mad Men, Donald Draper drives a 1970 Chevrolet Chevelle SS muscle car in the races at Bonneville Speedway.
In the film The World's Fastest Indian Burt Munro and his highly modified Indian Scout motorcycle sets a world record.

See also

 Bonneville Motorcycle Speed Trials (BMST)
 Black Rock Desert
 Land speed record
 List of vehicle speed records
 The World's Fastest Indian - a biographical sports drama film involving the Bonneville Salt Flats.
 National Register of Historic Places listings in Tooele County, Utah

References

 Utah Salt FlatsRacing Association
 Southern California Timing Association/Bonneville Nationals, Inc.
 "One Out Of Three Smashes Up." Popular Mechanics, August 1954, pp. 65–70/240, see page 70.

External links

 Speed Record Club

1911 establishments in Utah
Motorsport venues in Utah
Tourist attractions in Tooele County, Utah
Event venues on the National Register of Historic Places in Utah
Sports venues on the National Register of Historic Places in Utah

fr:Bonneville Speedway